George Brudenell, 3rd Earl of Cardigan (29 September 1685 – 5 July 1732), styled Lord Brudenell between 1698 and 1703, was a British peer.

Origins
He was the son of Francis Brudenell, Lord Brudenell, son and heir of Robert Brudenell, 2nd Earl of Cardigan. His mother was Lady Frances Savile, granddaughter of Thomas Savile, 1st Earl of Sussex.

Career
In 1703 he succeeded his grandfather in the earldom. In January 1709 he officially renounced his Roman Catholic faith (the Brudenells had been  Catholic for generations) in order to take his seat in the House of Lords. In 1712 he was appointed Master of the Buckhounds, a post he held until 1715.

Marriage and children
In 1703 he married Lady Elizabeth Bruce (1689-December 1745), a daughter of Thomas Bruce, 2nd Earl of Ailesbury, 3rd Earl of Elgin, by whom he had several children including:
George Montagu, 1st Duke of Montagu, 4th Earl of Cardigan, who was created Duke of Montagu in 1766;
James Brudenell, 5th Earl of Cardigan;
Robert Brudenell;
Thomas Brudenell-Bruce, 1st Earl of Ailesbury, who succeeded to the Bruce estates and was created Earl of Ailesbury in 1776.

Death
He died in July 1732 and was succeeded by his eldest son George Montagu, 1st Duke of Montagu, 4th Earl of Cardigan.

References

1685 births
1732 deaths
Earls of Cardigan
George
Masters of the Buckhounds